The Early Years Foundation Stage (EYFS) is the statutory framework for early years education in England. The term was defined in Section 39 of the British government's Childcare Act 2006.  The equivalents in Wales and Scotland are the Foundation Phase and the Early Years Framework.

The EYFS has been periodically updated since its introduction. The latest version was published in March 2021 for implementation in September 2021. This framework consists of three sections: The Learning and Development Requirements, Assessment and The Safeguarding and Welfare Requirements.

Areas of learning

All pupils in the Early Years must follow a programme of education in seven areas, divided into 'prime areas' and 'specific areas'.

The three prime areas:
 communication and language
 physical development
 personal, social and emotional development

The four specific areas:
 literacy
 mathematics
 understanding the world
 expressive arts and design

Mathematics in EYFS

In the context of mathematics, the framework says children must be given opportunities to develop their skills in the following areas: 

 Counting
 Understanding and using numbers
 Calculating simple addition and subtraction problems
 Describing shapes, spaces, and measure

Exemptions
The Childcare Act makes provision for exemptions from the Learning and development requirements for
 settings, under section 46(1)
 children individually, under section 46(2)

The circumstances under which exemptions may be granted are to be stipulated in the Early Years Foundation Stage (Exemptions from Learning and Development Requirements) Order, which as of 20 June 2008 had not yet been laid before Parliament.

Consultation and Debates

The Department for Children, Schools and Families conducted a consultation on the EYFS Learning and Development Exemptions, between 1 March and 24 May 2007. Respondents were invited to give their views on the circumstances accepted as possible grounds for exemption and the process by which exemptions could be obtained.

The proposed circumstances were:

The DCSF response to the consultation considered the first and third circumstances only:

Opponents of the EYFS have argued that some of the Learning and Development targets are not appropriate for this age group. Opponents claimed in the media that attempting to push under-5s into early literacy is ineffective or even counterproductive, possibly even producing reading difficulties in some children through the experience of early failure, and other problems including ADHD. These critics point to education systems in other countries where children start school at a later age but produce good academic results by the end of compulsory education. These media criticisms have been undermined by academic research showing that comprehensive approaches to early years education which, like the EYFS, include direct teaching of phonemic awareness, phonics, and other skills along with child-initiated activities produce better outcomes than purely play-based approaches. Similarly, a review of the academic research by the Education Endowment Foundation has found that "beginning early years education at a younger age appears to have a high positive impact on learning outcomes".

Some people have also claimed that the curriculum is too prescriptive, criticising the burdensome nature of the assessments demanded of children and stress inflicted upon young children by the curriculum and assessment (as with SATs for older children).

In responding to critics' submissions to the consultation, the DCSF pointed out that the EYFS is "sufficiently flexible to accommodate a range of early years approaches".

References

Child welfare in the United Kingdom
Education in the United Kingdom
Education in England
2008 in England